Picavus litencicensis is an extinct bird in the order Piciformes. It existed during the Rupelian (early Oligocene) in what is now the Czech Republic. It was described by Gerald Mayr and Růžena Gregorová in 2012, and is the only species in the family Picavidae.

References

Piciformes
Extinct monotypic bird genera
Oligocene birds
Extinct birds of Europe
Taxa named by Gerald Mayr